Alexandre Gavras (born August 23, 1969) is a French film producer.

Filmography

As a producer

As a director

References

External links
 

Living people
1969 births
Film people from Paris
French film producers
French people of Greek descent